Rocourt is a district of the city of Liège, Wallonia, located in the province of Liège,  Belgium. 

It is a former municipality which has been part of the municipality of Liège since 1977. 

Formerly known as Rocoux or Roucoux, it was the site of the battle of Rocoux in 1746, during the War of the Austrian Succession.
It is now known for its maternity hospital, one of the biggest in Belgium, where a few famous people were born, such as Justine Henin, Marie Gillain and David Goffin. 
Rocourt also hosted the stadium of RFC Liège from 1921 until 1995. The football club has played in new stadium in Rocourt since 2015.

References

Sub-municipalities of Liège
Former municipalities of Liège Province